Acanthonessa quadrispinosa is a species of beetle in the family Cerambycidae, the only species in the genus Acanthonessa.

References

Ectenessini